Stade Vélodrome de Rocourt, also known as Stade Jules Georges, was a multi-use stadium in Liège, Belgium. It was initially used as the stadium of R.F.C. de Liège matches.  It was closed in 1995.  The capacity of the stadium was 40,000 spectators. The UCI Track Cycling World Championships were held on the velodrome on four occasions: 1950, 1957, 1963 and 1975.

External links
 Stadium history

Defunct football venues in Belgium
Velodromes in Belgium
Football venues in Wallonia
Sports venues in Liège Province
Sport in Liège
History of Liège
Buildings and structures in Liège
RFC Liège